Waheedul Haq (March 16, 1933 – January 27, 2007) was a journalist, writer, and musicologist of Tagore songs.

Early life
Haq was born on March 16, 1933, at Bhawal Monoharia village under Keraniganj Upazila. His father, Mazharul Haq, was a member of Bengal legislative assembly in 1946. His mother was Mewa Begum. Waheedul was the eldest of three brothers and two sisters. His brother Rezaul Haq is a journalist and another brother Ziaul Haq was a martyr in 1971.

Haq grew up in the old part of Dhaka city and was educated in the Dhaka College. He married Sanjida Khatun and had three children: Apala Farhat Naved (late), Partha Tanveer Naved, and Ruchira Tabassum Naved.

Career
Haq and other activists founded Chhayanaut in 1961.

He also founded Kanthashilon, Nalonda, Anandadhani, Fulki, Bratochari Samity and Bashanto Utsab Udjapon Parishad. He formed the Jatiya Rabindra Sangeet Sammilon Parishad in 1980. He was also involved in filmmaking and the film society movement during the 1960s. He also composed the musical scores for the Indian director Ritwik Ghatak's film Titash Ekti Nadir Naam.

Journalism
During his fifty-five-year career in journalism, Haq wrote for The Daily Star, where he worked as an Assistant Editor and later as a Joint Editor. He was a shift in-charge of the Daily Observer in the 1960s. Since the late 1990s he worked as a freelance columnist in several newspapers including Bhorer Kagoj, Janakantha, The New Nation, The Morning News and The People.

Death
Haq died at Dhaka's Birdem Hospital on 27 January 2007. He had been suffering from pneumonia and lung and kidney diseases and had been undergoing treatment at the hospital for few weeks.

Works
Gaaner Bhetor Diye (Seen Through Music)
Chetona Dharaye Esho (Come With The Stream Of Consciousness)
Shangskriti Jagoroner Prothom Shurjo (The First Sun Of The Rising Of Culture)

Awards
Ekushey Padak for music (2008)
Independence Day Award for culture (2010)

References

1933 births
2007 deaths
Bangladeshi male writers
Recipients of the Ekushey Padak
Recipients of the Independence Day Award
University of Dhaka alumni
Dhaka College alumni